The Jatiyatabadi Ganatantrik Dal (Nationalist Democratic Party) was a 1977-78 coalition of the political supporters of the then-President of Bangladesh Ziaur Rahman. The convenor of the party was Vice President Justice Abdus Sattar. It was the predecessor of the modern Bangladesh Nationalist Party that was formed on 1 September 1978.

References 

Bangladesh Nationalist Party
Defunct political parties in Bangladesh
Political parties with year of establishment missing